Lilli Cooper (born March 4, 1990) is an American musical theatre actress.

Life and career
Cooper is the daughter of actor Chuck Cooper and Tisa Farley. Her grandfather acted at the Karamu House in Cleveland. She attended LaGuardia High School of Music & Art and Performing Arts and Vassar College, graduating from the latter in 2012.

She was the standby for Elphaba in the Broadway production of Wicked, and originated the role of Martha Bessell in Spring Awakening. She also played Hélène Kuragina in the American Repertory Theatre production of Natasha, Pierre & The Great Comet of 1812 in 2015. She originated the role of Sandy Cheeks in the Broadway production of SpongeBob SquarePants, which opened on December 4, 2017. In September 2018, Cooper played Julie Nichols in the musical adaptation of the 1982 film Tootsie in its Chicago debut and reprised the role on Broadway in spring 2019, receiving a nomination for a Tony Award for Best Actress in a Featured Role in a Musical for her performance.

In 2022, she played the role of Doc on Fraggle Rock: Back to the Rock. Also in 2022, she took part in the HBO documentary film Spring Awakening: Those You've Known, which saw the 15 year reunion of the original cast of the musical.

Cooper lives in New York City with her husband Paul. Their first child, a son named Bodie, was born in September 2021.

Theatre credits

Accolades

References

External links
 
 
 

American musical theatre actresses
Actresses from New York City
Living people
21st-century American actresses
1991 births
Fiorello H. LaGuardia High School alumni
Vassar College alumni